The 1929–30 Lancashire Cup was the 22nd occasion on which this regional rugby league competition had been held. Warrington won the trophy by beating Salford in the final by 15-2. The match was played at Central Park, Wigan. The attendance at the final was 21,012 and receipts £1,250.

Background 
The number of teams entering this year’s competition remained at 13 which resulted in 3 byes in the first round.

The semi-final clash between Salford and Swinton took two replays to decide. This resulted in Salford playing 5 matches (a semi-final, a league match, two replays and a final) within 11 days.

Competition and results

Round 1  
Involved  5 matches (with three byes) and 13 clubs

Round 2 - quarter-finals

Round 3 – semi-finals

Final

Teams and scorers 

Scoring - Try = three points; Goal = two  points; Drop goal = two  points

The road to success

See also 
1929–30 Northern Rugby Football League season

Notes  
 1 This was the first Lancashire Cup match to be played on this new ground.
 2 Central Park was the home ground of Wigan.

References

RFL Lancashire Cup
Lancashire Cup